N-Ethylheptylone (HEP) is a recreational designer drug from the substituted cathinone family, with stimulant effects. It is a homologue of related drugs such as ethylone, eutylone, ephylone and N-ethylhexylone but with a longer heptyl side chain. It was first reported in Sweden in 2019.

See also 
 α-PEP
 3F-NEH
 4F-PV9
 MDPHP
 N-Ethylheptedrone

References 

Designer drugs
Cathinones